Lincoln Goines (born 1953) is a double bassist and bass guitarist from Oakland, California.

Biography
A mainstay of the New York City jazz/Latin/studio scene since the early 1980s and noted for his versatility and fluid style, Goines' extensive career includes performance credits as sideman to Sonny Rollins, Paquito D'Rivera, Michel Camilo, Mike Stern, and Carly Simon. He is also an educator and author, having written "Funkifying The Clave: Afro-Cuban Grooves for Bass and Drums” with drummer Robby Ameen/Alfred Publishing 1996.

Goines was initially influenced by the rock music of his era including Jimi Hendrix, Jefferson Airplane, and Cream. He made the switch to jazz upon hearing John Coltrane's "A Love Supreme" and Miles Davis' "Bitches Brew".

Goines attended high school in Vancouver, British Columbia, Canada where he studied double bass with a former principal bassist of the Vancouver Symphony Orchestra, Sydney Keats. During this period of his development he also had lessons with Eddie Gómez and Gary Karr but is still considered to be primarily self-taught. Goines calls his method of learning "Trial by Fire" which he defines as "taking the gig and learning on the fly to survive".

Following the lead of bass guitarist Steve Swallow, Goines switched his primary focus to the electric bass in the mid-1970s. He relocated from the west coast to New York City in 1977 where he began studying Latin music with bassists Joe Santiago and Andy González, and the rhythms of Brazil with drummer/percussionist and frequent bandmate Portinho.

Goines' performance/touring credits include three decades as bassist for Latin jazz flutist and bandleader Dave Valentin, and a 20-year tenure with guitarist Mike Stern.

In 1986, Goines joined the faculty at The Collective in New York City and in 2008 became a Professor of Bass at the Berklee College of Music.

Discography

As leader
 The Art of the Bass Choir (Origin Records, 2022)

As co-leader
 Kim Plainfield and Lincoln Goines, Night and Day (EFA/Shiosai, 2001)

As sideman (selected)
With Bob Berg
 In the Shadows (Denon, 1990)
 Back Roads (Denon, 1991)

With Jeff Golub
 Naked City (Bluemoon/Atlantic, 1996)
 Out of the Blue (Bluemoon/Rhino, 1999)
 Grand Central (Narada, 2007)

With Bob Mintzer
 Incredible Journey (DMP, 1985)
 Spectrum (DMP, 1988)
 Urban Contours (DMP, 1989)
 The Art of the Big Band (DMP, 1990)
 Departure (DMP, 1991)
 For the Moment (MCG Jazz, 2012)

With Leni Stern
 Secrets (Enja, 1988)
 Closer to the Light  (Enja, 1990)
 Ten Songs (Lipstick, 1992)

With Mike Stern
 Odds or Evens (Atlantic, 1991)
 Play (Atlantic, 1999)
 Big Neighborhood (Heads Up, 2009)

With Dave Valentin
 The Hawk (GRP, 1979)
 Land of the Third Eye (GRP, 1980)
Mind Time (GRP, 1987)
 Live at the Blue Note (GRP, 1988)
 Two Amigos (GRP, 1990)
 Tropic Heat (GRP, 1993)

With others (selected)
 Idris Muhammad, You Ain't No Friend of Mine (Fantasy, 1978)
 Tania Maria, Come with Me (Concord Jazz, 1982)
 Bob Moses, Visit with the Great Spirit (Gramavision, 1983)
 Dave Grusin, Out of the Shadows (Arista, 1982)
 Dizzy Gillespie, New Faces (GRP, 1984)
 Claudio Roditi, Red On Red CTI Records,1984) 
Paquito D'Rivera, Celebration (Columbia, 1988)
 David Broza, Away from Home (RGB, 1989)
 Scott Cossu, Switchback (Windham Hill, 1989)
 Emily Remler, This Is Me, (1990)
 Marvin Stamm, Bop Boy (Musicmasters, 1991)
 Eliane Elias, A Long Story (Manhattan, 1991)
 Wayne Krantz, Long to Be Loose (Enja, 1993)
 Dave Samuels, Del Sol (GRP, 1993)
Wayne Krantz, 2 Drink Minimum (Enja, 1995)
 Dar Williams, End of the Summer (1997)
 Michel Camilo, Thru My Eyes (Columbia Records, 1997)
 Ryo Kawasaki, Cosmic Rhythm (1999)
 Bill Connors, Return (2005)
 Carly Simon, This Kind of Love (Hear Music, 2008)
 Bill O'Connell, Jazz Latin (Savant, 2018)
 Robby Ameen, Diluvio (Origin, 2020)

References

External links 
Lincoln Goines Official Website
Fodera Guitars
Epifani Amplification
The Collective
Berklee College of Music

Living people
1953 births
American session musicians